= Deers Ears Butte =

Mountain in South Dakota, United States

Coordinates: 44°59′54″N 103°11′07″W

Deers Ears Butte is a summit in South Dakota, in the United States. With an elevation of 3,396 feet (1,035 m), Deers Ears Butte is the 281st highest summit in the state of South Dakota.

Deers Ears Butte was so named on account of its outline being in the shape of erect deer's ears.
